Brookula decussata is a species of sea snail, a marine gastropod mollusk unassigned in the superfamily Seguenzioidea.

This species is considered sometimes a synonym of Brookula pfefferi Powell, A.W.B., 1951, but B. decussata is somewhat smaller and a has a more definite sculpture with fewer spirals and more axials.

Description
The maximum recorded size of the shell is 2.5 mm.

Distribution
This marine species occurs off the South Orkney Islands and off The Antarctic Peninsula.

References

 Powell, A. W. B. 1951. Antarctic and Subantarctic Mollusca: Pelecypoda and Gastropoda. Discovery Reports 26: 47–196, pls. 5–10
 Dell, R. K. 1990. Antarctic Mollusca, with special reference to the fauna of the Ross Sea. Royal Society of New Zealand Bulletin 27: iv + 311 pp
 Numanami, H. and T. Okutani. 1991. A new species of the genus Brookula collected by the icebreaker Shirase from Breid Bay, Antarctica (Gastropoda: Cyclostrematidae). Venus 50: 37–42.
 Numanami, H. 1996. Taxonomic study on Antarctic gastropods collected by Japanese Antarctic research expeditions. Memoirs of National Institute of Polar Research (E)39: [v] + 244 pp.
 Engl W. (2012) Shells of Antarctica. Hackenheim: Conchbooks. 402 pp.

decussata
Gastropods described in 1903